Samuel Bouhours (born 26 June 1987) is a French professional footballer who plays as a defender.

Professional career
Bouhours helped Stade de Reims win the 2017–18 Ligue 2, helping promote them to the Ligue 1 for the 2018–19 season. On 15 October 2018, Bouhours joined Championnat National side  Laval on a free transfer.

Honours
Reims
 Ligue 2: 2017–18

References

External links
 
 

1987 births
Living people
Footballers from Le Mans
French footballers
Association football defenders
Le Mans FC players
AC Ajaccio players
Tours FC players
Stade de Reims players
Stade Lavallois players
Ligue 1 players
Ligue 2 players
Championnat National players